Cedar Grove Cemetery is a historic cemetery located at New Bern, Craven County, North Carolina.  It was established in 1800, and is encircled by a magnificent paneled coquina wall built in 1853 and broken by a towering triple-arch entrance.  It includes family plots, some of which are enclosed by cast iron fencing.  Located in the cemetery is the Confederate memorial. The cemetery was owned by Christ Episcopal Church until 1853, when it was transferred to the town of New Bern.

It was listed on the National Register of Historic Places in 1972.

Notable burials
 Congressman Charles Laban Abernethy (1872–1955)
 Congressman Graham Arthur Barden (1896–1967)
 Pepsi inventor Caleb Bradham (1867–1934)
 Congressman Samuel M. Brinson (1870–1922)
 Author Mary Bayard Clarke
 Congressman Richard Spaight Donnell (1820–1867)
 Congressman and jurist William Gaston (1788–1844)
 Educator Moses Griffin
 Confederate General Robert Ransom, Jr. (1828–1892)
 Congressman Charles Biddle Shepard (1808–1843)
 Congressman Furnifold McLendel Simmons (1854–1940)
 Congressman John Stanly (1774–1833)
 Congressman Charles R. Thomas (1827–1891)
 Congressman Charles R. Thomas (1861–1931)
 Congressman William Henry Washington (1854–1940)
 Artist William Joseph Williams (1813–1860)

References

External links
 
 

Cemeteries on the National Register of Historic Places in North Carolina
1800 establishments in North Carolina
Buildings and structures in New Bern, North Carolina
National Register of Historic Places in Craven County, North Carolina
Protected areas of Craven County, North Carolina